Robert Greig (30 May 1871 – 10 January 1951) was a Scotland international rugby union player.

Rugby union career

Amateur career
Greig played with Glasgow Academicals. He was playing with the club from 1889. The club had a Spring Meeting festival day in 1891. As part of that, there was a drop kick tournament to see how far the contenders could drop kick a goal. Greig won the tournament by drop kicking from 61 yards out, though it was aided by the wind.

Provincial career
Greig played for Glasgow District against Edinburgh District in the 1892 inter-city match.

He also played for the West of Scotland District in their match against East of Scotland District on 21 January 1893.

He played for Cities District against Provinces District on 23 December 1893.

International career
Greig was capped twice for Scotland between 1893 and 1897.

Administrative career
He became the 30th President of the Scottish Rugby Union. He served one year from 1903 to 1904.

Cricket career
He was playing for the Glasgow Academical Cricket Club in 1891.

References

1871 births
1951 deaths
Cities District players
Glasgow Academicals rugby union players
Glasgow District (rugby union) players
Presidents of the Scottish Rugby Union
Rugby union players from Glasgow
Scotland international rugby union players
Scottish rugby union players
West of Scotland District (rugby union) players